Rothmans International plc was a British tobacco manufacturer. Its brands included Rothmans, Player's and Dunhill. Its international headquarters were in Hill Street, London and its international operations were run from Denham Place in Denham Village, Buckinghamshire.

The company was listed on the London Stock Exchange and was once a constituent of the FTSE 100 Index, but it was acquired by British American Tobacco in 1999. Its business was the strongest in Europe and it specialised in premium brands.

History 
The company was founded by Louis Rothman in 1890 as a small kiosk on Fleet Street in London. In 1900 Rothman opened a small showroom in Pall Mall, from where he launched his famous Pall Mall cigarette brand. His reputation was such that King Edward VII granted Rothmans a royal warrant in 1905. Rothmans was first listed on the London Stock Exchange in 1929.

In 1954 the Rembrandt Tobacco Company acquired a controlling interest in Rothmans. Rembrandt was expanding and in 1958 acquired Carreras, who in turn took a 51% stake in Alfred Dunhill in 1967.

In the 1970s Rothmans became involved in sponsorships, sponsoring the British Olympic team in 1972 and the inaugural Hong Kong Sevens in 1976. They also sponsored Rothmans Football Yearbook, an annual football reference book, from 1970 until 2002.

In Malaysia, Rothmans was one of the popular brands of cigarette, so much so that one of the roundabouts in Petaling Jaya was named 'Rothmans Roundabout' owing to its proximity to the former headquarters of Rothmans of Pall Mall Malaysia (now British American Tobacco Malaysia). It has since converted to a 4-way junction.

In 1988 Lord Swaythling became chairman and chief executive.

In January 1996 the Rembrandt Group and Richemont merged their tobacco business under the "Rothmans International" name. Then in 1999 Rothmans was acquired by British American Tobacco. The takeover resulted in the closure of the Rothmans Spennymoor and Darlington manufacturing plants in 2000 and 2001 respectively, with production moved to a larger plant at Southampton.

Sponsorship of motorsports

Rothmans was an active promoter of motorsports in the 1980s and 1990s.

From 1982 onwards, Rothmans supported the factory Porsche sports car racing effort, winning the 1982 24 Hours of Le Mans with a 1-2-3 finish with their Porsche 956. They would win the event a further three times in the 1980s. Rothmans-Porsche also won the 1985 World Sportscar Championship before the team officially pulled out of the championship in 1987. 

Rothmans were the title and founding partner of the Rothmans-Porsche Challenge Cup single-make Porsche 944 series founded by Jack Christie, which ran from 1986 to 1991.

Rothmans sponsorship also extended to rallying, where they sponsored Walter Röhrl's 1982 World Rally Championship-winning Opel Ascona 400. In 1984 Porsche produced the 911 SC RS rally car specifically for Rothmans with the car being run by David Richards and the newly formed Prodrive.  Rothmans also sponsored the winning Porsche team at the 1986 Paris-Dakar rally.

Porsche left rallying when the Group B category was dropped, and Rothmans transferred its association to the Subaru rally team, also run by Prodrive. Coincidentally, Richards was sponsored by Rothmans when he was co-driving Ari Vatanen to his privateer 1981 World Drivers' Championship success aboard the Ford Escort RS1800. The association with Prodrive would last until 1992, when their sponsorship was replaced by sister brand State Express 555.

Between 1985 and 1993, Rothmans supported the works Honda team in Grand Prix motorcycle racing. Rothmans then transferred their association to Williams during the World Championship from 1994 until 1997. However, their time with Williams was marred when Ayrton Senna, considered by some to be the greatest Formula 1 driver of all time, died behind the wheel of the Rothmans-Williams during the 1994 San Marino Grand Prix. Damon Hill won the 1996 title and Jacques Villeneuve in 1997. Sponsorship was transferred in 1998 to Winfield, another sister brand.

Rothmans was also the naming rights sponsor for Australian team Allan Moffat Racing in the early rounds of the inaugural World Touring Car Championship in 1987 (the Moffat team lad a long association with Rothmans who sponsored the team's Mazda RX-7s in the early-mid 1980s in Australian Touring car racing through their Peter Stuyvesant brand). Driving a V8 powered Holden VL Commodore SS Group A, team boss Allan Moffat and co-driver John Harvey won the first ever WTCC race, the 1987 Monza 500. The pair would later drive the Rothmans sponsored car to outright 4th place in the 1987 Spa 24 Hours.

Products and brands

 Rothmans International
 Rothmans Biru
 Rothmans King Size Filter
 Benson & Hedges
 Black Cat
 Consulate Menthol 
 Craven A
 Dunhill
 Golden American
 John Player's Gold Leaf
 Kent
 Pall Mall
 Perilly's
 Peter Stuyvesant
 Royals 25's
 State Express 555
 St Moritz Menthol 
 Winfield

Distribution products

 Dji Sam Soe (:id)
 L&M
 Longbeach
 Marlboro
 ST Dupont Paris
 U Mild (:id)

Notes

References

External links

 Company history
 

Tobacco companies of the United Kingdom
British American Tobacco brands
Cigarette brands
Manufacturing companies based in London
Manufacturing companies established in 1890
Manufacturing companies disestablished in 1999
Companies formerly listed on the London Stock Exchange